Exaucé Mayombo (born 23 August 1990 in Berlin) is a German-Congolese retired footballer who played as a striker.

Career 
Mayombo started his career in the youth section of the SV Tasmania-Gropiusstadt 1973. In July 2006 he scouted was by VfL Wolfsburg, but only 18 months later he moved back to his hometown and signed a contract with Tennis Borussia Berlin, where he scored five goals in seventeen games. In July 2008 Mayombo joined to FC Carl Zeiss Jena. After scoring six goals in eleven Under 19 Fußball-Bundesliga games he was promoted to the first team in January 2009. In August 2011 he left Jena and signed a contract with Dynamo Dresden II. He was released by Dynamo after one season, but returned to the club six months later.

References

External links
 
 
 Exaucé Mayombo at kicker.de 
 FC Carl Zeiss Jena profile 

1990 births
Living people
Democratic Republic of the Congo footballers
Association football forwards
3. Liga players
FC Carl Zeiss Jena players
Dynamo Dresden II players
German sportspeople of Democratic Republic of the Congo descent
Footballers from Berlin